The Lynn Masonic Hall is a historic Masonic building located at 64-68 Market Street in Lynn, Massachusetts.  The four story brick building was built in 1880 for the Lynn branch of YMCA.  It is one of two surviving Victorian Gothic buildings in downtown Lynn.  YMCA occupied the building until 1907, when it moved to other quarters (no longer extant) across the street.  The building was sold to the local Masonic lodge.

The building was listed on the National Register of Historic Places in 1979.

See also
National Register of Historic Places listings in Lynn, Massachusetts
National Register of Historic Places listings in Essex County, Massachusetts

References

Clubhouses on the National Register of Historic Places in Massachusetts
Masonic buildings in Massachusetts
Buildings and structures in Lynn, Massachusetts
Masonic buildings completed in 1880
National Register of Historic Places in Lynn, Massachusetts

YMCA buildings in the United States